Karen-Mae Hill,  is the High Commissioner for Antigua and Barbuda to the United Kingdom and member of the Commonwealth's Board of Governors. Hill is also the Ambassador Extraordinary and Plenipotentiary of Antigua and Barbuda to the Republic of Estonia. She won a scholarships to study French and law at the University of Leicester in the United Kingdom before becoming the first Antiguan to win a Rhodes Scholarship to Oxford. Hill is a qualified Barrister in English law. She is the founder of the Antigua and Barbuda Youth Symphony Orchestra, co-founder and music director at the Potters Youth Group and an advocate for green technology.

Education 
Hill received a Bachelor of Law with French Law and Language (LLB) degree from the University of Leicester, UK. She received a MPhil in Development Studies from the University of Oxford, England.

Career 
After receiving her degrees, Hill served as a lawyer in England, Wales, and the Eastern Caribbean. She also worked in banking in Antigua.

Hill was appointed High Commissioner in November 2015. As High Commissioner, she signed the Multilateral Convention on Mutual Administrative Assistance in Tax Matters in 2018, making Antigua and Barbuda the 125th jurisdiction to do so. In 2021, she signed the Joint Communiqué that established of diplomatic relations between the Kyrgyz Republic and Antigua and Barbuda.

References

External links 

 Karen-Mae Hill LinkedIn

High Commissioners of Antigua and Barbuda to the United Kingdom
Women ambassadors
Year of birth missing (living people)
Living people
Caribbean Rhodes Scholars
Alumni of the University of Leicester
21st-century women
Women lawyers
Officers of the Order of the British Empire